The following is a list of cycleways in Wales.

Celtic Trail cycle route (a multiple-route trail between Chepstow and St Davids, using parts of Routes 42, 43, 46, 47, 49, and 492, 4, the Millennium Coastal Path and a large part of Route 8 (Lon las Cymru
Lôn Las Cymru (see National Cycle Route 8) Holyhead to Cardiff
Millennium Coastal Path (forms a section of both the Celtic Trail cycle route, (part of Route 47 and Route 4)
National Cycle Route 4 (London to Fishguard)
National Cycle Route 5 (Reading – Holyhead, taking in the North Wales coast
National Cycle Route 8 ('Lôn Las Cymru') (Cardiff to Holyhead)
National Cycle Route 42 (Gloucester – Cinderford – Parkend – Chepstow – Abergavenny – Hay-on-Wye – Glasbury)
National Cycle Route 43 (Swansea – Caehopkin – Llanwrtyd Wells – Builth Wells)
National Cycle Route 46 (Bromsgrove – Droitwich – Worcester – Hereford – Abergavenny – Merthyr Tydfil – Neath)
National Cycle Route 47 (Newport – Neath – Swansea – Llanelli – Carmarthen – Fishguard)
National Cycle Route 49 (Abergavenny – Pontypool – Cwmbran – Newport)
National Cycle Route 81 ('Lon Cambria' Aberystwyth – Shrewsbury – Telford – Wolverhampton – NCR 5 at Smethwick also known as Lon Cambria)
National Cycle Route 82 ('Lôn Las Ogwen': Bangor – Capel Curig - Porthmadog – Dolgellau – Machynlleth (–) Ystrad Meurig – Fishguard)
National Cycle Route 84 (Rhyl – St Asaph - Llangollen – Oswestry)
National Cycle Route 85 (Chester – Wrexham - Trevor – Llangollen - Corwen – Bala – Dolgellau)
National Cycle Route 88 (Caerleon – Newport – Cardiff – Bridgend)
Route 423 (Cwmbran – Monmouth – Ross (former RR30 and Peregrine Path)
Route 436 (Dulais Valley, South Wales)
Route 437 (South Wales to Glanaman)
Route 438 (South Wales to Glanaman)
Route 439 (South Wales to Glanaman)
Route 440 (Milford Haven)
Route 446 (Carmarthen – Llandysul)
Route 447 (Cardiganshire to Newcastle Emlyn)
Route 448 (Crymych – Cardigan)
Route 465: Pontypool – Hafodyrynys (- Crumlin); (Aberbeeg -) Cwm – Beaufort
Route 466: Valleys
Route 467: Sirhowy Valley (Blackwood - Holybush / Pouchin - Tredegar)
Route 468: Rhymney Valley (Pengam - Bute Town)
Route 469: Bargoed – (Fochriw – Rhymney)
Route 475: Caerphilly – Senghenydd
Route 476: Trelewis – Taff Bargoed
Route 477: Edwardsville – Merthyr Tydfil
Route 478: Abercynon – Llwydcoed
Route 492: Cwmbran – Brynmawr
Route 566: Anglesey north coast
Route 811: Valleys – Porth-Pontypridd (Rhondda Fach)
Route 818: Llangurig NCN81 high level braid
Route 819: Rhayader-Strata Florida southern braid
Route 820: Llanwrtyd Wells – Strata Florida/NCN81
Route 822: Aberaeron – Lampeter
Route 825: Radnor Ring
Route 862: Gellings Greenway: Kirkby – Knowsley (Liverpool)
Route 881: Valleys (Rhondda Valley / Pontypridd – Maerdy)
Route 882: Valleys (Rhondda Valley / Treorchy)
Route 883: Valleys (Ogmore Valley)
Route 884: Valleys (Garw Valley)
Route 885 (Bridgend – Maesteg – Afan Forest Park)
Route 887 (Port Talbot – Pontrhydyfen – Afan Forest Park)
Taff Trail (partly follows the National Cycle Network Route 8, Lôn Las Cymru)
The National Byway -including stretches among the Welsh Marches

See also
Conservation in the United Kingdom
Cycleways in England

References